Arvest Ballpark is a stadium in Springdale, Arkansas. It is primarily used for baseball, as the home of the Northwest Arkansas Naturals of the Texas League.  The ballpark has a capacity of 7,305 people and opened in 2008.  Arvest Ballpark was designed by the Kansas City architecture firm Populous. Arvest Ballpark was named the 2008 Ballpark of the year by baseballparks.com

History
Springdale's Mayor Jerre M. Van Hoose and the head of the Chamber of Commerce, Perry Webb, knew what it would take to bring the affiliated Minor Leagues to the area. Not only would they have to find a team willing to move, they would also need to provide them with a better facility than what they would be leaving behind. A referendum was held on July 11, 2006, where local voters approved by a narrow margin the continuation of a 1% sales tax to fund the ballpark.

Ground for the ballpark was broken on February 27, 2007. Construction was performed by Crossland Construction and completed in April 2008.  On September 10, 2007, a naming rights deal was reach with Arvest Bank Group, Inc. of nearby Bentonville, and the new ballpark's official name was introduced as Arvest Ballpark on October 5, 2007.

The first game played at Arvest Ballpark was the 2008 opening day game between the Naturals and the San Antonio Missions on April 10, 2008.  The Naturals lost 7-1 in front of a sellout crowd of 7,820.

Images

References

External links
Arvest Ballpark

Baseball venues in Arkansas
Buildings and structures in Springdale, Arkansas
Tourist attractions in Washington County, Arkansas
2008 establishments in Arkansas
Sports venues completed in 2008
Populous (company) buildings
Texas League ballparks